The Washington Canoe Club is a boat club on the Potomac River.
It is located at 3700 K Street, Northwest, Washington, D.C., in the Georgetown neighborhood. It was established in 1904. The Canoe Club was listed in the National Register of Historic Places in on March 19, 1991.

History
The Washington Canoe Club was originally built on pilings facing the Potomac River.
During the 1960s, the Army Corps of Engineers demolished the piers of the Potomac Aqueduct Bridge.
The bank under the Canoe Club became stagnant and was subsequently filled with concrete.
Shortly thereafter the area north of the Canoe Club was paved.
The club leased the land from the Baltimore & Ohio Railroad, and now the National Park Service.

The club has produced national champions, and Olympic medalists.

Olympic medalists
Frank Havens 1948 Silver medal; 1952 Gold medal
Francine Fox; Glorianne Perrier 1964 Silver medal
Norman Bellingham 1988 Gold medal

References

External links

 

Clubhouses on the National Register of Historic Places in Washington, D.C.
Buildings and structures completed in 1904
1904 establishments in Washington, D.C.
Canoe clubs in the United States
Georgetown (Washington, D.C.)
Event venues on the National Register of Historic Places in Washington, D.C.
Sports venues on the National Register of Historic Places